A guyed mast or guyed tower is a tall thin vertical structure that depends on guy lines (diagonal tensioned cables attached to the ground) for stability.  The mast itself has the compressive strength to support its own weight, but does not have the shear strength to stand unsupported.  It requires guy lines to stay upright and to resist lateral forces such as wind loads. Guy lines are usually spaced at equal angles about the structure's base.

Guyed masts are used for telecommunications, sailing, and meteorology.
The tallest guyed mast in the world is currently the  KVLY-TV mast near Blanchard, North Dakota, USA.

Two subtypes exist.
A partially guyed tower is a structure consisting of a guyed mast on top of a freestanding tower. The guys may be anchored to the top of the freestanding structure, or to the ground.  A famous tower of this type is the Gerbrandy Tower.
An additionally guyed tower is a freestanding tower which either has guys attached temporarily to add stability, for example during construction, or guys attached in only one direction to support unidirectional shear stresses.  An example of the latter type is a utility pole at the end of a power line where the line ends or angles off in another direction.  The pole requires guys in only one direction to support the unbalanced lateral load of the power line in the other direction.

Applications
Guyed masts are frequently used for radio masts and towers.  The mast can either support radio antennas (for VHF, UHF and other microwave bands) mounted at its top, or the entire structure itself can function as a mast radiator antenna (for VLF, LF, MF).  In the latter case, the mast needs to be insulated from the ground.  Guyed radio masts are typically tall enough that they require several sets of guy lines, 2 to 4, attached at different heights on the mast, to prevent them from buckling.  An exception was the Blaw-Knox tower, widely used during the 1930s, whose distinctive wide diamond (rhomboidal) shape gave it the shear strength that it only required one set of guys.

Guyed masts are sometimes also used for measurement towers, to collect meteorological measurements at certain heights above ground level.

Sometimes they are used as pylons (transmission towers), although their usage in agricultural areas is problematic because anchor foundations handicap ploughing.

Sailing masts, the masts that support the sails on sailboats, are also typically guyed masts.

Additionally guyed tower

An additionally guyed tower is a free-standing tower, which is also additionally guyed.

An additional guying can be temporarily or permanent. Temporarily additional guying is used when work on static relevant parts of the tower is done. A permanent guying is attached when the construction has to withstand strong forces in a certain direction – for example, some types of electricity pylon where the conductors change their direction or terminate. Towers carrying horizontally spun wire antennas are sometimes additionally guyed. Sometimes towers in windy areas are additionally guyed in order to withstand increased strain.

The main advantage of additional guying is that it is cheaper than building a completely free-standing tower, which can withstand the same force. Furthermore, it allows for very easy upgrading of existing structures. The disadvantage of additional guying is that it requires much more ground space and that the guy basements handicap the work of agriculture. There is also a danger that the guys can be damaged at their basement anchors, so the basements need to be fenced in.

Partially guyed tower

A partially guyed tower is a tower structure which consists of a free-standing basement, in most cases of concrete or of lattice steel, with a guyed mast on the top. The anchor basements of the guyed mast can be on the top of the tower or on the ground.

Use
Partially guyed towers are typically used when a very high tower for FM and TV transmission is required, while also carrying antennas for directional radio services at a much lower height. In such cases the antennas for directional radio services are mounted on the top of the free-standing part of the tower, while the guyed mast on its top carry the FM and TV antennas.
They can be also used in order to upgrade small stable towers (like watertowers) with a long antenna mast for FM and TV broadcasting.
However their use is rare, and they exist chiefly in certain European countries.

Note that mast radiators which stand atop an antenna tuning hut ( helix building) are not considered partially guyed towers, because the hut is much smaller than the mast radiator. Such constructions include the Mühlacker radio transmitter and the Ismaning radio transmitter.

Anchor placements
Partially guyed towers can be divided into two types, depending on the placement of the guy anchors.

Anchors atop the free-standing tower
Guyed masts on skyscrapers or wider towers are often guyed on the roof of the free-standing basement structure.
In such cases, there is no major constructive difference of the guyed mast to a guyed mast on plain ground, and the construction of the free-standing basement tower does not differ much from a tower of the same height without a mast. The guyed mast of such constructions is usually of lesser height than basement tower.

Anchors on the ground
Partially guyed towers in which at least one basement of the guy anchors is on the ground are more rare. The placement of guy basements across a broader geometric base allows for a mast much taller than the free-standing basement tower, and the integration of tower and mast should be considered in all facets of construction and maintenance.

Gallery

See also
List of masts for examples of guyed mast structures.

References